Alexeyevskoye Urban Settlement is the name of several municipal formations in Russia.

Alexeyevskoye Urban Settlement, a municipal formation which the work settlement of Alexeyevsk and two rural localities in Kirensky District of Irkutsk Oblast are incorporated as
Alexeyevskoye Urban Settlement, a municipal formation which the urban-type settlement of Alexeyevskoye in Alexeyevsky District of the Republic of Tatarstan is incorporated as

See also
Alexeyevsky (disambiguation)

References

Notes

Sources

